Kleztory is a klezmer and world music ensemble founded in 2000 and based in Montreal, Quebec,  Canada. While remaining respectful of the rich heritage of klezmer, Kleztory takes the liberty of arranging parts of the traditional repertoire.  This gives their music their own personal uniqueness and flavor.  Kleztory is influenced by many sources of inspiration including jazz,  classical, gypsy, country, folk and blues. The ensemble were awarded both the Opus Prize in 2007 as the best Jazz / World Music album of the year in Québec for Nomade, and the Fürth Klezmer Prize at the 3rd International Jewish Music Festival in Amsterdam in 2012.

Personnel
Current members include Elvira Misbakhova (violin), Airat Ichmouratov (clarinet, bass clarinet, duclar), Mark Peetsma (double bass), Dany Nicolas (guitar) and Melanie Bergeron (accordion). Three of the original founding  members remain in the group with Melanie Bergeron replacing Henri Oppenheim (accordion) and Dany Nicolas replacing founding guitarist Alain Legault. During 2013-2014 Kleztory collaborated with Alexandru Sura (cimbalom).

History

Kleztory has played in a wide variety of Montreal venues, and over the course of their career spanning 2000 - 2017 they have performed numerous concerts worldwide including presentations in Canada, USA, Netherlands, Germany, Austria, Belgium, Hungary, Switzerland, Romania, Brazil, Mexico, Costa Rica and China.  In 2012 Kleztory was selected as the only Canadian participant to compete at the 3rd International Jewish Music Festival in Amsterdam and were successful in winning the Fürth Klezmer Prize and as result appeared at Furth Klezmer Festival (Germany) during the following spring. In October 2015 Kleztory will be the only Canadian Artist selected to perform a showcase sponsored by Folquebec at Womex in Budapest, Hungary.  Kleztory has appeared as the soloist with numerous orchestras including the Montreal Symphony Orchestra, Orchestre Métropolitain, the Orchestre Symphonique de Québec, I Musici de Montréal Chamber Orchestra, Les Violons du Roy, Brussels Chamber Orchestra just to name few…

Recordings
Kleztory produced its first CD, entitled  ‘Kleztory – Musique Klezmer’ at the beginning of 2001. Few years later they recorded a second CD in collaboration with the I Musici de Montréal Chamber Orchestra, under the direction of Yuli Turovsky, which was then internationally distributed on the Chandos Records Label in the spring of 2004. In March 2007 they released a third CD called Nomade. This album won them an Opus Prize in 2007 as the best Jazz / World Music album of the year in Québec. In 2013 Kleztory launched new album "Arrival" which was nominated as Best album of the year in Traditional music category by ADISQ, complete with a new stage show.

Discography
2001 - Kleztory – Musique Klezmer   
2004 - Klezmer with Yuli Turovsky and I Musici de Montréal Chamber Orchestra (Chandos Records) 
2007 - Nomade (Amerix)
2013 -  Arrival (Amerix)
 2017 - Nigun (Amerix)

Awards
2014 - nominated for ADISQ "Traditional Album of the Year" for Arrival
2012 - winner of Opus Prize in 2007 as the best Jazz / World Music album of the year in Québec for Nomade
2012 - winner of the Fürth Klezmer Prize at the 3rd International Jewish Music Festival in Amsterdam

See also
Secular Jewish music
World music

References

External links
Kleztory official site

Klezmer groups
Canadian folk music groups
Canadian world music groups